Mount Durham is a mainly ice-free mountain,  high, standing at the east side of the mouth of Scott Glacier and marking the northwestern limit of the Tapley Mountains in the Queen Maud Mountains of Antarctica. First observed in December 1929 by the Byrd Antarctic Expedition (ByrdAE) geological party under Laurence Gould, the mountain was climbed in December 1934 by the ByrdAE geological party under Quin Blackburn, and was named by Richard E. Byrd after Durham, NH, the seat of the University of New Hampshire and home of Stuart D.L. Paine, a member of the latter party.

References 

Mountains of the Ross Dependency
Gould Coast